Streptomyces roseolilacinus is a bacterium species from the genus of Streptomyces which has been isolated from soil.

See also 
 List of Streptomyces species

References

Further reading

External links
Type strain of Streptomyces roseolilacinus at BacDive -  the Bacterial Diversity Metadatabase	

roseolilacinus
Bacteria described in 1958